Harald Hansen (14 March 1884 – 10 May 1927) was a Danish amateur football (soccer) player, who played as a defender for the Denmark national football team, with whom he won silver medals at the 1908 and 1912 Summer Olympics. He played his entire club career for Copenhagen club B 93.

Career
Hansen took part in the first official Danish national team game, played at the 1908 Summer Olympics. He played all Denmark's three matches at the tournament, as the team won silver medals. Four years later, Hansen played all three Danish matches at the 1912 Olympics. In the semi-finals against the Netherlands, Hansen scored an own goal, as Denmark won 4–1. Like in 1908, Denmark met Great Britain in the final, and once more they won silver medals. Hansen ended his national team career after the 1912 Olympics, having played seven national team games.

References

External links
Danish national team profile
DatabaseOlympics profile

1884 births
1927 deaths
Danish men's footballers
Denmark international footballers
Boldklubben af 1893 players
Footballers at the 1908 Summer Olympics
Footballers at the 1912 Summer Olympics
Olympic footballers of Denmark
Olympic silver medalists for Denmark
Danish football managers
Aarhus Gymnastikforening managers
Olympic medalists in football
Medalists at the 1912 Summer Olympics
Medalists at the 1908 Summer Olympics
Association football defenders
Footballers from Copenhagen